Mike Moore (born September 25, 1993) is a Canadian football defensive end for the Montreal Alouettes of the Canadian Football League (CFL).

College career
Moore played college football with the Virginia Cavaliers from 2012 to 2015.

Professional career

Ottawa Redblacks
Moore made his professional debut with the Ottawa Redblacks on June 25, 2016, against the Edmonton Eskimos where he had one defensive tackle. In 2016, he played in eight regular season games where he had 10 defensive tackles, two sacks, and one forced fumble. He did not play in any post-season games that year and was on the injured list when the Redblacks won the 104th Grey Cup. He was released by the Redblacks on March 9, 2017.

Edmonton Eskimos / Elks
On May 26, 2017, Moore was signed by the Edmonton Eskimos. He played in just 12 games over the next two seasons, but had a career year in 2019 when he played in 17 regular season games and recorded 23 defensive tackles and nine sacks. He did not play in 2020 due to the cancellation of the 2020 CFL season. Moore re-signed with Edmonton to a contract extension through 2022 on December 26, 2020. In a shortened 2021 season, he played in 11 games where he had 19 defensive tackles and two sacks.

Montreal Alouettes
On January 14, 2022, Moore was traded to the Montreal Alouettes in exchange for Tony Washington and Martese Jackson.

References

External links
Montreal Alouettes bio

1993 births
Living people
People from Hyattsville, Maryland
Players of American football from Maryland
American football defensive ends
Virginia Cavaliers football players
Ottawa Redblacks players
Edmonton Elks players
Montreal Alouettes players